Ischnopsyllidae is a family of fleas belonging to the order Siphonaptera.

Genera

Genera:
 Alectopsylla Mahnert, 1976 
 Allopsylla Beaucournu & Fain, 1982 
 Aptilopsylla Ewing, 1940

References

Fleas
Insect families